Sir Harry Verney, 2nd Baronet PC, DL, JP (8 September 1801 – 12 February 1894) was an English soldier and Liberal politician who sat in the House of Commons variously between 1832 and 1885.

Background and education
Born Harry Calvert, he was the oldest son of Sir Harry Calvert, 1st Baronet and his wife Caroline Hammersley, second daughter of Thomas Hammersley. He was first educated at Harrow School, and then, aged fifteen, went to the Royal Military Academy Sandhurst as one of its first cadets. In 1826, he succeeded his father as baronet and in the following year, he changed his surname by Royal Licence to Verney to inherit the Verney family estates of his cousin Mary Verney, 1st Baroness Fermanagh. From 1829, he studied at Downing College, Cambridge as a fellow-commoner, befriending Adam Sedgwick and William Whewell.

Career
Verney joined the British Army for the 31st (Huntingdonshire) Regiment of Foot in 1819 and was sent to the country's legation in the German states Württemberg and Baden, learning during this time German, French and Italian. He returned to England in the following year and was allocated to the 7th (Royal Fusiliers) Regiment of Foot. From 1824, he served with the Grenadier Guards and from 1826 was private secretary in the office of the Commander-in-Chief of the Forces. Verney was meant to accompany Lord William Bentinck on his appointment as Governor-General of India, however during the journey was left ill in Rio de Janeiro, where he recovered, later hunting with natives in the Pampas and the Andes. His voyage home led him around Cape Horn on board a ship commanded by Sir Michael Seymour, and in 1829 he arrived in England again. Verney was promoted to major in 1831 and was transferred to the Royal Buckinghamshire Militia (King's Own) in 1844, retiring two years later.

Verney entered the British House of Commons in 1832, sitting as a Member of Parliament (MP) for Buckingham until 1841. After a six-year break, he was successful for Bedford and represented it until 1852. Verney was again returned for Buckingham in 1857 until the 1874 general election. In 1880, he was reelected for the constituency for the following five years. In 1885, in his final year in the House, Verney was sworn a Privy Counsellor.

Verney was nominated a deputy lieutenant of Buckinghamshire and a justice of the peace for the same county. He was a fellow of the Royal Geographical Society and one of the founders of the Royal Agricultural Society. Verney acted as chairman of the Buckinghamshire Railway Company and deputy chairman of the Aylesbury and Buckingham Railway Company.

Family
On 30 June 1835, he married firstly Eliza Hope, daughter of Admiral Sir George Johnstone Hope, and had by her four sons and three daughters. After her death in 1857, Verney married Frances Parthenope Nightingale, daughter of William Edward Nightingale and sister of Florence Nightingale, on 24 June 1858. He died, aged 92 and was succeeded in the baronetcy by his oldest son Edmund. His youngest son Frederick was a diplomat and politician and father of Sir Ralph Verney, 1st Baronet.

Legacy
Verney was unusual in the sense that he gave his name to two railway stations in England, namely Calvert and Verney Junction stations in Buckinghamshire. Mount Verney, Sir Harry Peak and Sir Harry Range in British Columbia were also named after him.
To this day, one of the campuses of the University of Buckingham (housing the Law School) is named "Verney Park".

References

External links

1801 births
1894 deaths
Harry
Alumni of Downing College, Cambridge
Baronets in the Baronetage of the United Kingdom
Deputy Lieutenants of Buckinghamshire
Fellows of the Royal Geographical Society
Members of the Privy Council of the United Kingdom
Liberal Party (UK) MPs for English constituencies
People educated at Harrow School
Grenadier Guards officers
Graduates of the Royal Military College, Sandhurst
UK MPs 1832–1835
UK MPs 1835–1837
UK MPs 1837–1841
UK MPs 1847–1852
UK MPs 1857–1859
UK MPs 1859–1865
UK MPs 1865–1868
UK MPs 1868–1874
UK MPs 1880–1885
Royal Fusiliers officers
East Surrey Regiment officers
British Militia officers